First-seeded Lew Hoad defeated Sven Davidson 6–4, 8–6, 6–3 in the final to win the men's singles tennis title at the 1956 French Championships.

Seeds
The seeded players are listed below. Lew Hoad is the champion; others show the round in which they were eliminated.

  Lew Hoad (champion)
  Budge Patty (fourth round)
  Sven Davidson (finalist)
  Arthur D. Larsen (fourth round)
  Giuseppe Merlo (semifinals)
  Jaroslav Drobný (fourth round)
  Ashley Cooper (semifinals)
  Tut B. Bartzen (first round)
  Luis Ayala (fourth round)
  Kurt Nielsen (fourth round)
  Herbert Flam (quarterfinals)
  Bob Perry (fourth round)
  Paul Rémy (quarterfinals)
  Don Candy (fourth round)
  Jacques Brichant (quarterfinals)
  Roger Becker (fourth round)

Draw

Key
 Q = Qualifier
 WC = Wild card
 LL = Lucky loser
 r = Retired

Finals

Earlier rounds

Section 1

Section 2

Section 3

Section 4

Section 5

Section 6

Section 7

Section 8

References

External links
   on the French Open website

1956
1956 in French tennis